Sarn Park services is a motorway service station on the M4 motorway in Bridgend County Borough, Wales. It is situated at junction 36 of the motorway, north of the town of Bridgend, and is owned by Welcome Break. Bridgend Designer Outlet is on the opposite side of the motorway.

The service station has a Burger King restaurant, a Starbucks coffeehouse and a WHSmith bookshop, as well as a Days Inn hotel.

References

External links 
 
Motorway Services Online - Sarn Park

M4 motorway service stations
Welcome Break motorway service stations
Motorways in Wales
1986 establishments in Wales
Commercial buildings completed in 1986